is a Japanese actress. Shibuya debuted as a model when she was one year old. She has played the role of Minako Aino in the Sailor Moon musicals.

Filmography
Ugly Duckling (1996)
Himawari (2000)
Swan Song (2002)
Otasuke Girl (2003)

External links
JMDb Profile (in Japanese)
Cube's profile (Japanese)

1987 births
Japanese child actresses
Japanese female models
Japanese idols
Japanese stage actresses
Japanese television actresses
Living people
Actresses from Kanagawa Prefecture